Aliturgical Days are days in the liturgical year when mass is not celebrated.

In the Latin liturgical rites the only fully aliturgical day is Good Friday.

In the Eastern Orthodox Church there are more aliturgical days.

References

Eastern Orthodox liturgy
Catholic liturgy